Kozminski may refer to:

Koźmiński (surname)
Kozminski University, a private, non profit business school in Warsaw, Poland
United States v. Kozminski, a United States Supreme Court case involving the Thirteenth Amendment to the United States Constitution
Cyclops Kozminskii, a crustacean in the genus Cyclops
Powiat Koźmiński, Polish name of Kreis Koschmin, a county in the southern administrative district of Posen, in the Prussian province of Posen